Diadegma auranticolor is a wasp first described by Aubert in 1979. No subspecies are listed.

References

auranticolor
Insects described in 1979